Carla Suzanne Denyer (born 1985) is a British politician who has served as co-leader of the Green Party of England and Wales since 2021. She has been a city councillor in Bristol since 2015 (initially for Clifton East ward, and since the 2016 boundary changes for Clifton Down). She is also noted for her lead role in bringing about Bristol City Council's declaration of a climate emergency in 2018, which was the first in Europe.

Education and early career 
Denyer went to a state school before studying mechanical engineering at St Chad's College, Durham from 2005 to 2009. She went on to work in the wind energy sector, working for a Bristol-based renewable energy consultancy, GL Garrad Hassan, from 2009 until shifting her career to politics.

Denyer joined the Green Party in 2011. Her political campaigning included participating in direct action campaigning against SUVs in Clifton. From 2012 she developed an interest in ethical investment and specifically fossil-fuel divestment through participation in the Quakers and the UK Fossil Free campaign. She participated in bringing about British Quakers' divestment from fossil fuels.

Following her work on the Quakers' divestment, Denyer became a leading figure in the campaign for the University of Bristol to divest from fossil fuels, first tabling a motion in her capacity as a city councillor sitting on one of the university's governance bodies in November 2015. Despite initial defeats, the campaign succeeded in March 2017. Denyer also participated in achieving the 2015 divestment of Bristol's Avon Pension Fund from fossil fuels.

Bristol councillor

First council terms (2015–2021) 
Denyer was first elected to Bristol City Council as a Green Party councillor for Clifton East in 2015. After boundary changes, she was elected as councillor for Clifton Down in 2016.In 2018, Denyer proposed a successful motion to bring about Bristol City Council's declaration of a climate emergency. This was the first such declaration by a UK council, and one of the first in the world. Denyer has been seen as a key figure in launching a movement of government climate-emergency declarations. BBC news credited Denyer with the idea of first putting forward 'the idea of a local area declaring a climate emergency'. Denyer's motion was described in The Independent as "the historic first motion" which by July 2019 had been "copied by more than 400 local authorities and parliament".

As of 2019, Denyer remained critical of Bristol's progress towards achieving its goal, and particularly of the planned expansion of Bristol Airport. She criticised the UK government's lack of support for environmental policies, noting that the political will existed in local government. In 2020, she welcomed Bristol's declaration of an ecological emergency due to loss of wildlife.

Denyer continued campaigning on traffic as a councillor, focusing on cars parking in cycle lanes and trying to introduce congestion charging to the city. Her other campaigning has included improving conditions for people renting their homes, and opposing council tax increases for poorer taxpayers while seeking what Denyer has described as "more ambition from the mayor's office in tackling austerity" by calling for the city to raise the top band of council tax. In 2020, she helped institute a Green Party policy to ban advertisements for polluting products such as SUVs and flights, and pushed for a similar policy in advertising controlled by Bristol City Council.

European and UK Parliament candidacies 
In May 2019, Denyer unsuccessfully stood as one of the Green candidates for South West England in the European Parliament Election. The elections saw her refusing to share a platform with the UKIP candidate Carl Benjamin regarding a hustings planned to be held at the University of Bristol, arguing that "while the protection of free speech is important, we have to guard against the far-right taking advantage of it".

In November 2019, she stood as the Green candidate for Bristol West in the 2019 UK general election. The seat was seen as a target for the Green Party. The Greens participated in the Unite to Remain campaign, leading to discussion as to whether she or the standing Labour MP Thangam Debbonaire was the more convincing candidate for pro-EU voters. Denyer argued that polls predicting that Debbonaire would receive 60% of the vote didn't take into account the Liberal Democrats standing down in favour of the Greens. In the event, Denyer came second, with 24.9% of the vote to Debbonaire's 62.3%.

Second council term (2021–present) 
Denyer was re-elected as a councillor in 2021 with an increased majority, in the context of growing support for the Green Party in Bristol. In June 2021, she criticised Bristol Airport for claiming to be on course to be carbon neutral without taking emissions from flights, travel to and from the airport, or car parking into account. In July, she took on the role of shadowing Bristol's Labour cabinet on climate and ecology, holding the position jointly with Lily Fitzgibbon.

In June 2021, Denyer was appointed as the Green Party's housing and communities spokesperson.

Leader of the Green Party 
On 16 August 2021, Denyer announced her joint candidacy for leader of the Green Party alongside former deputy leader Adrian Ramsay. They were elected on 1 October 2021. Denyer is the first openly bi leader of a major political party in England.

Awards 
Denyer received a "special mention" in the Local Government Information Unit's Councillor Achievement Awards in the category "Environment and Sustainability Pioneer" (October 2019). She received the UK Local Government Association's 2018–2019 Clarence Barrett Award for outstanding achievement "for her work on the Climate Emergency motion which has been carried forward by councils everywhere". In 2020, she was named in the sustainability category by the Women's Engineering Society as one of the UK's top fifty women in engineering, with the commendation focusing on her climate emergency motion, and in Bristol Live's "Pink List" of the most influential LGBT+ people in Bristol.

In 2019, Denyer was also nominated for the Bristol Diversity Awards in the politician category, and was involved in her employer's achievement of the Best Promotional Incentive Award in the 2013 Travelwest Sustainable Business Travel Awards for encouraging staff car-sharing.

Electoral performance

European Parliament

House of Commons

Bristol City Council

Clifton East

Clifton Down

Leader of the Green Party

References

External links 
 
 Bristol City Council profile

Green Party of England and Wales parliamentary candidates
Green Party of England and Wales councillors
Living people
Councillors in Bristol
21st-century English politicians
21st-century British women politicians
Alumni of St Chad's College, Durham
English LGBT politicians
21st-century LGBT people
1985 births
Women councillors in England
British Quakers
Leaders of political parties in the United Kingdom